Woodstock Collegiate Institute is a school in Woodstock, Ontario, Canada. It is part of the Thames Valley District School Board.

The school was founded in 1841 by an Act of Parliament as Woodstock's first grammar school. Its growth forced a series of physical moves; the school relocated in 1851, 1881, and to its present site in 1939.

The school faced possible closing at the end of the 20th century. It underwent major faculty improvements, including renovating science classrooms, that were completed in 2001.

Notable alumni

Alfred Apps, lawyer
Isabel Ecclestone Mackay, novelist
John Millar, member of Parliament
Clark Murray, member of Parliament
Beatrice Nasmyth, suffragette 
Wally Nesbitt, member of Parliament
George Pattullo, journalist
Harry Smith, politician

References

Woodstock, Ontario
1841 establishments in Canada
Educational institutions established in 1841
High schools in Oxford County, Ontario